Regan Craig Walker (born 4 June 1996) is a former English footballer who played for Bury.

Career
Born in Manchester, Walker began his career with Bury having previously been at Manchester City's academy. He made his Football League debut on 2 November 2013 in a 3–1 defeat against Torquay United.

On 27 March 2014, he joined Conference Premier club Hyde on loan until the end of the season.

After leaving Bury at the end of the season he discovered a tumour on his leg and was diagnosed with Ewing's sarcoma, a rare form of cancer that forced him to retire from football.

References

External links

1996 births
Living people
English footballers
Footballers from Manchester
Association football forwards
English Football League players
National League (English football) players
Manchester City F.C. players
Bury F.C. players
Hyde United F.C. players